Jennifer Campeau (born 1973) is a Canadian former politician, who was elected to the Legislative Assembly of Saskatchewan in the 2011 election and was re-elected in 2016. She represented the electoral district of Saskatoon Fairview as a member of the Saskatchewan Party caucus.

She served as Minister of Central Services from 2014 to 2016 and as legislative secretary to the minister of education for First Nations student achievement from 2016 to 2017.

Campeau resigned from the legislature effective July 2, 2017 to accept a job with mining company Rio Tinto in British Columbia.

Cabinet positions

References

Living people
Women government ministers of Canada
Members of the Executive Council of Saskatchewan
Saskatchewan Party MLAs
Women MLAs in Saskatchewan
1973 births
21st-century Canadian politicians
21st-century Canadian women politicians
First Nations politicians
Politicians from Saskatoon